This article describes the home video releases of science fiction television series Andromeda.

ADV Films 
Andromeda has been released on both Region 1 and Region 2 DVD. Andromeda was initially released on "collection" volumes with 2 or three episodes on a single sided disk.  This was shortly followed by a complete boxed season in North America.  After the first season, the sets consist of five two-sided DVDs rather than the 10 individual DVDs.  For Region 2, Andromeda was originally released in volumes and complete season boxsets are being released in 2006. A Complete Boxset of all five seasons has been released on both Region 1 and Region 2 DVD; the Region 2 version is called Andromeda: The Complete Boxset whereas the Region 1 version is called Andromeda: The Slipstream Collection. The series has been released in Australia (Region 4), first in volumes, 1.1-1.9, 2.1-2.10, 3.1, 3.9, 4.1-4.11 and 5.1-5.11. Then individual season from 2007-2008 followed by two edition of the Season 1-5 boxset, one being 5 amaray cases in a slip box, the second being 5 amaray cases in a collector's tin, then Beyond Home Entertainment released a Season 1-5 box set (5 amaray cases with clip box), and lastly, Via Vision Entertainment released a Season 1-5 boxset.

Season releases

Volume releases

Alliance Films

References 

Andromeda (TV series)
Andromeda

ru:Андромеда (телесериал)#DVD релизы